Israel participated in the Eurovision Song Contest 2021 in Rotterdam, the Netherlands, having internally selected Eden Alene as their representative. She was due to compete in the 2020 contest with "" before the event's cancellation. Her entry for 2021, "Set Me Free", was chosen during the national selection competition  ("Our Song for Eurovision") organised by the Israeli Public Broadcasting Corporation (IPBC/).

Background 

Prior to the 2021 contest, Israel had participated in the Eurovision Song Contest forty-two times since its first entry in 1973.

Israel has won the contest on four occasions: in 1978 with the song "" performed by Izhar Cohen and the Alphabeta, in 1979 with the song "" performed by Milk and Honey, in 1998 with the song "" performed by Dana International and in 2018 with the song "Toy" performed by Netta Barzilai.

Since the introduction of the semi-finals in 2004, Israel has failed to reach the final six times. In , Shiri Maimon gave the country its tenth top five result, finishing fourth. Israel's fourth victory came when Netta won the  contest in Lisbon, with the song "Toy". , when the contest was held in Tel Aviv, Kobi Marimi represented the country on home soil with the song "Home", finishing twenty-third with 35 points in the final.

Before Eurovision

Artist selection 
On 22 March 2020,  confirmed that Eden Alene would be kept as the Israeli representative for the Eurovision Song Contest 2021, and in December 2020, it was revealed that the song that Alene would represent Israel with in Rotterdam for 2021 would be selected through a national final called  ("Our Song for Eurovision").

HaShir Shelanu L'Eurovizion 

After previous reports that the national final would consist of three live shows of 4 songs each, it was revealed the winning song would be selected over two rounds of online voting through Kan's official website. In the first round, demo versions of the nine competing songs were released on 2 December 2020 and the public was able to vote until 13 December 2020. The two songs with the most votes advanced to the second round and the professional committee selected an additional song from the remaining seven to advance. In the second round, the three songs, finalized and re-recorded by Alene, were to be released on 18 January 2021, however the songs were officially released on 5 January 2021 after an early publication by the newspaper . The public was able to vote for their favourite song between 19 January and 25 January 2021, and the winning song was revealed during a special televised broadcast on 25 January 2021 from the Yitzhak Rabin Center in Tel Aviv, hosted by Lucy Ayoub.

At Eurovision 
According to Eurovision rules, all nations with the exceptions of the host country and the "Big Five" (France, Germany, Italy, Spain and the United Kingdom) are required to qualify from one of two semi-finals in order to compete in the final; the top ten countries from each semi-final progress to the final. The European Broadcasting Union (EBU) split up the competing countries into six different pots based on voting patterns from previous contests, with countries with favourable voting histories put into the same pot. For the 2021 contest, the semi-final allocation draw held for 2020 which was held on 28 January 2020, was used. Israel was placed into the first semi-final, which was held on 18 May 2021, and was scheduled to perform in the second half of the show.

Semi-final 

Once all the competing songs for the 2021 contest had been released, the running order for the semi-finals was decided by the shows' producers rather than through another draw, so that similar songs were not placed next to each other. Israel was set to perform in position 12, following the entry from Belgium and preceding the entry from Romania.

On May 18, the day the semi-final was held, Israel qualified for the Grand Final. During her performance, Alene hit the highest note ever sung in the Eurovision Song Contest, reaching B6 whistle note.

Final 
Israel performed 3rd in the grand final on 22 May 2021, following Albania and preceding Belgium. The song has received 93 points at the close of voting, finishing 17th overall.

Voting 
Voting during the three shows involved each country awarding two sets of points from 1–8, 10 and 12: one from their professional jury and the other from televoting. Each nation's jury consisted of five music industry professionals who are citizens of the country they represent, with a diversity in gender and age represented. The judges assess each entry based on the performances during the second Dress Rehearsal of each show, which takes place the night before each live show, against a set of criteria including: vocal capacity; the stage performance; the song's composition and originality; and the overall impression by the act. Jury members may only take part in panel once every three years, and are obliged to confirm that they are not connected to any of the participating acts in a way that would impact their ability to vote impartially. Jury members should also vote independently, with no discussion of their vote permitted with other jury members. The exact composition of the professional jury, and the results of each country's jury and televoting were released after the grand final; the individual results from each jury member were also released in an anonymised form.

Points awarded to Israel

Points awarded by Israel

Detailed voting results 
The following members comprised the Israeli jury:
 Noy Alooshe
 Roni Duani (Roni Superstar)
 Avia Farchi

References

External links 
 

2021
Countries in the Eurovision Song Contest 2021
Eurovision